"Your Lucky Day in Hell" is a song by American rock band Eels. It was the fourth single to be released from their 1996 debut album, Beautiful Freak.

Music video 

Around the same time, a video was released to promote the single, featuring various shots filmed with high-8 cameras. This video featured a remixed version of the song. This remix also received moderate airplay on U.S. modern rock stations. The video was shown on MTV's 12 Angry Viewers and was aired several times on 120 Minutes between December 1997 and January 1998.

B-sides 

The 7" vinyl and the CD single contain a cover of the Rickie Lee Jones song "Altar Boy". The CD single had "Susan's Apartment" as a bonus track. Both songs were included on the compilation album B-Sides & Rarities 1996–2003.

Release 

Released on August 27, 1997, it fared less well commercially than the album's previous singles, stalling at number 35 in the UK Singles Chart in September 1997, thereby failing to repeat the prior singles' Top 10 success.

Legacy 

"Your Lucky Day in Hell" was featured in the films Scream 2 (1997), Grosse Pointe Blank (1997), The Maker (1997), Dead Man on Campus (1998) and Yes Man (2008).

Track listing 

 CD

 7" vinyl

 Cassette

References 

Eels (band) songs
1996 songs
1997 singles
Songs written for films
Songs written by Mark Oliver Everett
Song recordings produced by Mark Oliver Everett
DreamWorks Records singles
Songs written by Mark Goldenberg